Yi Jingqian (born 28 February 1974, in Nanjing) is a retired tennis player from China. Yi first played in the China Fed Cup team in 1991, and turned professional in 1994. In her career, she won 13 singles titles and six doubles titles on tournaments of the ITF circuit. Yi appeared in the finals of two WTA Tour tournaments in 1995: those at Surabaya and Pattaya. She appeared in the main draw in several major tournaments as a singles player from 1996 to 2001. The furthest she progressed in a major was when she reached the third round of the 2000 Australian Open.

Yi was part of the Chinese Fed Cup team in 1991, 1993, 1995, 1997, 1998, and 2000. She represented China at the 1996 and 2000 Summer Olympics. Over the course of her career, she won four medals (three bronze, one silver) at the Asian Games. She retired from professional tennis in 2001.

WTA Finals

Singles (0-2)

ITF finals

Singles (13–9)

Doubles (6–5)

External links
 
 

1974 births
Living people
Olympic tennis players of China
Chinese female tennis players
Tennis players at the 1996 Summer Olympics
Tennis players at the 2000 Summer Olympics
Sportspeople from Nanjing
Asian Games medalists in tennis
Tennis players at the 1994 Asian Games
Tennis players at the 1998 Asian Games
Asian Games silver medalists for China
Asian Games bronze medalists for China
Medalists at the 1994 Asian Games
Medalists at the 1998 Asian Games
Universiade medalists in tennis
Universiade gold medalists for China
Tennis players from Jiangsu
20th-century Chinese women
21st-century Chinese women